Krystian Długopolski (born 3 August 1980) is a Polish former ski jumper who competed from 1997 to 2007, mainly at Continental Cup level. His best World Cup finish was tenth in Sapporo on 27 January 2002. In the Summer Grand Prix he finished sixth twice, in both an individual and team event in Hinterzarten on 6–7 August 2005. He also competed at the 1998 Winter Olympics.

References

1980 births
Living people
Polish male ski jumpers
Universiade medalists in ski jumping
Sportspeople from Zakopane
Universiade bronze medalists for Poland
Medalists at the 2003 Winter Universiade
Olympic ski jumpers of Poland
Ski jumpers at the 1998 Winter Olympics